Marvin Switzer (born October 28, 1954) is a former American football defensive back. He played for the Buffalo Bills in 1978.

References

1954 births
Living people
American football defensive backs
Kansas State Wildcats football players
Buffalo Bills players